Karnataka Sampark Kranti Express may refer to:

 Karnataka Sampark Kranti Express (via Hubballi)
 Karnataka Sampark Kranti Express (via Ballari)
 Yesvantpur–Chandigarh Karnataka Sampark Kranti Express